Jinny Hahn (née Sandhu; born 28 September 1987) is an English retired professional wrestler. She is best known for her time in WWE, where she performed mononymously as Jinny.

Early life 
Jinny Sandhu was born in London on 28 September 1987, and grew up in London's Knightsbridge district. She is of Indian descent. She first started watching wrestling when she was nine and was influenced by Jushin Liger, Lita, and Trish Stratus. She earned a BSc in psychology from Birmingham City University in 2012.

Professional wrestling career

Early career (2015–2021)
Sandhu was trained by Progress Wrestling and was the first female graduate of Progress's Projo wrestling school. In January 2015, she had her first singles match at Progress ENDVR:8, defeating Pollyanna. At ENDVR:12, Jinny defeated Toni Storm. At ENDVR:15, Jinny defeated Leva Bates. At Chapter 28, Jinny defeated Toni Storm. At Chapter 34, Jinny and Marty Scurll defeated Laura Di Matteo and Mark Haskins. At Chapter 36, Jinny, Alex Windsor and Dahlia Black defeated Pollyanna, Nixon Newell and Laura Di Matteo. In August 2017, Jinny and Deonna Purrazzo defeated Dahlia Black and Dakota Kai. The next night Jinny and Purrazzo were defeated by Kai. At Chapter 66, Jinny and Mercedes Martinez defeated Toni Storm and Shazza McKenzie. Jinny and Austin Theory defeated Kay Lee Ray and Will Ospreay at Chapter 67. At Chapter 69, Jinny defeated Toni Storm to become Progress Women's Champion for her first time. Jinny successfully defended the championship against Dakota Kai. On 30 December, she lost the title to Jordynne Grace.

Jinny made her debut for Pro Wrestling Chaos in 2015. At Pro Wrestling Chaos 20, she was defeated by Leva Bates. In 2017, Jinny and Jetta were defeated by Sierra Loxton and Melina. Jinny won the Maiden of Chaos Championship by defeating Martina, making her the inaugural champion.

Jinny became the inaugural South Coast Queen Of The Ring Champion by defeating Lana Austin in 2015.

In 2016, Jinny made her Pro Wrestling EVE debut, being defeated by Jetta. On 15 July 2017, Jinny defeated Emi Sakura.

Jinny as Jinny Couture made her Revolution Pro Wrestling debut in June 2016, defeating Addy Starr. In 2017, she defeated Veda Scott. Jinny became the inaugural Revpro Women's Champion after defeating Deonna Purrazzo in the RevPro British Women's Title Tournament finals. She successfully defended the title against Millie McKenzie and Bea Priestley. Jinny lost the title to Jamie Hayter in 2018.

Jinny debuted for German promotion, Westside Xtreme Wrestling in 2016 defeating Dahlia Black. Later that same night she was defeated by Alpha Female in a four-way that also included Shanna and Melanie Gray. In 2017, Jinny defeated Thunder Rosa.

WWE (2017–2023) 
In April 2017, Jinny took part in WWE's WrestleMania 33 Axxess, where she was defeated by Toni Storm on day two and three of the axxess. A little over a year later, in June 2018, it was announced that WWE had signed Jinny to a contract. Around that time, Jinny was announced as one of the four women who would compete in a fatal four-way match to determine the number one contender for the NXT Women's Championship on day one of United Kingdom Championship Tournament. At the event, Jinny was injured during the match, forcing her out of it and the match was later reverted to a triple threat between Toni Storm, Killer Kelly and Isla Dawn.

In July, Jinny took part of the 2018 Mae Young Classic, where she was defeated in the first round by her rival Toni Storm. Shortly after her participation in the Mae Young Classic, Jinny was announced as part of the women's roster in the newly created NXT UK brand. After a series of vignettes promoting her debut, Jinny made her television debut on 7 November episode, where she attacked Dakota Kai from behind after she lost a match against Toni Storm. Jinny would then enter a tournament for the inaugural NXT UK Women's Championship, where she would defeat Millie McKenzie in the first round only to be eliminated from the tournament by Toni Storm in the semi–finals.

On the 15 May 2019 episode of WWE NXT UK, Jinny alongside the debuting Jazzy Gabert interrupting a match between Killer Kelly and Xia Brookside, attacking the two in the process and taking on Gabert as her enforcer. On the 19 June episode of NXT UK, Jinny, as well as other women, competed in a battle royal to determine who will get a future opportunity for the NXT UK Women's Championship. In the match, Jinny  got eliminated by Brookside. On the 17 July episode of NXT UK, Jinny defeated Brookside, thanks to Gabert's interference. Following this, Jinny and Jazzy went on to feud with Rhea Ripley and Piper Niven, where they ultimately came out on the losing side of things in various tag and singles matches. Jinny defeated Amale on the 19 December episode of WWE NXT UK, where after the match Jazzy refused to continue to beat down Amale, which led to the two parting ways as they went into 2020. On 2 April 2020, Jinny teamed with Kay Lee Ray in a successful effort against Niven and Dani Luna.

On 24 September 2020, Jinny made her return to NXT UK television, staring at Kay Lee Ray after her successful title defense against Niven. The following week, Jinny made her return to the ring by defeating Xia Brookside and claiming she would be even more ruthless than ever before. On 5 November 2020, Jinny defeated newcomer Aleah James in a fairly fast squash match. After the match, Jinny called out Niven, claiming that she lacked killer instinct and the determination to be champion. During a Falls Count Anywhere championship match between Ray and Niven on 19 November 2020, she first attacked Niven at ringside, costing her the match and allowing Ray to retain. On 26 November 2020, Jinny defeated Isla Dawn, and after the match, mocked Niven, saying that she hoped she was watching from the hospital. Tensions continued to boil between Jinny and Niven, and eventually a match between the pair was announced for the first episode of NXT UK in 2021, where the winner would be the next to challenge Kay Lee Ray for the championship. On 7 January 2021, Jinny successfully defeated Niven after interference from Joseph Conners, whom Jinny seemed to have aligned herself with. Two weeks later, on the 21 January episode of NXT UK, Jinny was defeated by Ray, who retained her championship despite interference from Conners. Following this, Jinny and Conners would continue to feud with Piper Niven, who gained an unlikely ally in Jack Starz. On the 11 March 2021 episode of NXT UK, Jinny and Conners were defeated by Niven and Starz in a mixed tag team match. Conners eventually defeated Starz in a singles match, thus ending the feud between the two teams.

Jinny would then begin to feud with Aoife Valkyrie, saying that Valkyrie avoided her since her arrival in NXT UK. On 22 July 2021 episode of NXT UK, Jinny would appear on Supernova Sessions, where she vowed to end Valkyrie, and later that evening Valkyrie handed Jinny a feather to signal that she accepted Jinny's challenge. On July 29 2021 episode of NXT UK, Jinny defeated Valkyrie following a distraction from Joseph Conners. It was then announced that Jinny would face Valkyrie again, but this time it would be in a no disqualification match where Conners was locked in a cage; Jinny failed to win that match. The following week, Jinny claimed that although she lost the match, she won the war. On 16 September episode of NXT UK, Jinny found that Isla Dawn had invaded her dressing room. The following week, Jinny defeated Dawn. In the last months of NXT UK, Jinny developed an issue with Amale, and on the 27 January 2022 episode of NXT UK, Jinny defeated her by pinfall. 

In January 14, 2023, on her Twitter account, Jinny announced her retirement from wrestling due to an injury.

Acting career 
Sandhu had an uncredited role in an episode of the crime drama series DCI Banks.

Personal life 
Sandhu met Austrian professional wrestler Walter Hahn, better known as Gunther, when they both wrestled on the Independent Circuit, and began dating while in NXT. They were married in 2022.

Filmography

Television

Championships and accomplishments
Pro Wrestling Chaos
Maiden of Chaos Championship (1 time)
Pro Wrestling Illustrated
Ranked No. 45 of the top 100 female wrestlers in the PWI Female 100 in 2019
Progress Wrestling
Progress Women's Championship (2 times)
Revolution Pro Wrestling
RevPro British Women's Championship (1 time)
RevPro British Women's Title Tournament
South Coast Wrestling
South Coast Queen of the Ring Championship (1 time)

References

External links
 
 

Living people
1989 births
English female professional wrestlers
Professional wrestling managers and valets
Alumni of Birmingham City University
Sportspeople from London
Actresses from London
21st-century professional wrestlers
English people of Indian descent
Progress Wrestling World Women's Champions
Undisputed British Women's Champions